New Hanover High School is a high school located in downtown Wilmington, North Carolina. New Hanover High is the oldest existing high school in Wilmington. The original building was designed by William J. Wilkins. Construction started in 1919, and was completed in 1922. New Hanover High underwent a complete renovation at the start of the 21st century. It is a part of New Hanover County Schools.

New Hanover is the most diverse high school in New Hanover County.  The school's ethnicity is 50% Caucasian, 43% African-American, 5% Hispanic and 2% of other ethnic classification. The school has an enrollment of 1,721 students & staff of 930 people.

Sports 
The tradition of Wildcat Athletics is exemplified in the 30 North Carolina High School Athletic Association (NCHSAA) State Championships. These include 14 Boys Basketball, 5 Baseball, 4 Football, 3 Boys Tennis, 3 Softball, and 3 Boys Golf.

In popular culture
The high school's gym was featured in a season 4 episode of the TV series One Tree Hill when the Tree Hill Ravens played their state semifinal game vs. Verona.  It was also featured in the 1987 film Hiding Out, 1989 film Dream a Little Dream, and in the film Blue Velvet.

Notable alumni 
Kadeem Allen (born 1993), basketball player in the NBA and currently for Hapoel Haifa in the Israeli Basketball Premier League
 Cody Arnoux, professional soccer player
 Nick Becton, NFL offensive tackle
 Charlie Boney, architect
 David Brinkley, longtime news anchor for NBC and ABC; famous for the Huntley-Brinkley Report and This Week
 Thomas E Capps, CEO Dominion Energy 1990-2005, growing company from 5 Billion to 28 Billion Capitalization.
 Lauren Collins, staff writer for The New Yorker
 Alge Crumpler, NFL tight end (2001–2010) and four-time Pro Bowl player
 Rod Delmonico, former baseball coach at the University of Tennessee
 Roman Gabriel, NFL quarterback, four-time Pro Bowl player and first team All-Pro in 1969
 Kenny Gattison, NBA player
 Beth Grant, actress
 James Goodnight, CEO SAS Institute
 William D. Halyburton, Jr., U.S. Navy hospital corpsman in World War II, posthumous Medal of Honor recipient
 Ed Hinton, actor known particularly for guest-starring roles on television westerns
 Will Inman, poet
 Sonny Jurgensen, Pro Football Hall of Fame quarterback, played with the Washington Redskins and Philadelphia Eagles
 Clarence Kea, professional basketball player
 Charles P. Murray, Jr., U.S. Army officer in World War II and Medal of Honor recipient
 Mike Nifong, North Carolina district attorney disbarred for misconduct in the Duke lacrosse case
 Trot Nixon, MLB right fielder
 Don Payne, writer and producer for The Simpsons and other television and film projects
 Robert Daniel Potter, U.S. District Judge
 Cecil R. Reynolds, noted psychologist, author, and test developer
 Jay Ross, NFL defensive tackle
 Robert Ruark, author of Something of Value
 Lamar Russ, professional boxer in the middleweight division
 George Edward "Bo" Shepard, former head basketball coach of the North Carolina Tar Heels
 Reggie Shuford, ACLU attorney, left before graduation
 Sonny Siaki, American Samoan professional wrestler
 Clyde Simmons, NFL defensive end
 Ross Tomaselli, professional soccer player
 Ty Walker, professional basketball player

References

External links 
 "New Hanover High School Fact Sheet." New Hanover County Schools. 2008.

Public high schools in North Carolina
Schools in Wilmington, North Carolina
Educational institutions established in 1922
1922 establishments in North Carolina